"A Bird in a Gilded Cage" is a song composed by Arthur J. Lamb  and Harry Von Tilzer. It was a sentimental ballad (or tear-jerker) that became one of the most popular songs of 1900, reportedly selling more than two million copies in sheet music. Jere Mahoney (Edison) and Steve Porter (Columbia) recorded two early popular versions of this song.

Background

According to Von Tilzer, he was approached in 1899 by Lamb with the lyrics for a song. Although Von Tilzer liked it, he asked Lamb to change some of the words to make it clear that the woman in the song was married and not a mistress. Later that evening, as he worked out a melody at a piano in a public house with some friends, he noticed that many of the girls nearby were crying, which convinced him the song could be a hit. Later, Von Tilzer would claim that this song was "the key that opened the door of wealth and fame" for him. Its success signalled the dominance of ballads in American popular music through 1914.

Synopsis

The song describes the sad life of a beautiful woman who has married for money instead of love. Its lyrics are as follows:

The ballroom was filled with fashion's throng,

It shone with a thousand lights,

And there was a woman who passed along,

The fairest of all the sights,

A girl to her lover then softly sighed,

There's riches at her command;

But she married for wealth, not for love, he cried,

Though she lives in a mansion grand.

She's only a bird in a gilded cage,

A beautiful sight to see,

You may think she's happy and free from care,

She's not, though she seems to be,

'Tis sad when you think of her wasted life,

For youth cannot mate with age,

And her beauty was sold,

For an old man's gold,

She's a bird in a gilded cage.

I stood in a churchyard just at eve',

When sunset adorned the west,

And looked at the people who'd come to grieve,

For loved ones now laid at rest,

A tall marble monument marked the grave,

Of one who'd been fashion's queen,

And I thought she is happier here at rest,

Than to have people say when seen,

In popular culture
Tony Martin sings it with Edith Fellows in the movie "Music in my Heart." Bing Crosby included the song in a medley on his album On the Sentimental Side (1962). The song is performed by the heroine Nellie in Matthew O'Reilley's melodramatic operetta "Lost in the City (or The Triumph of Nellie)," which was a popular choice for high school productions in the early 1980s. Sylvester Stallone sings the song in his guest spot of The Muppet Show. Elmo sings the first verse of this song when he is a pet bird in a bird cage in the Elmo's World segment Pets on Sesame Street.
Malcolm McLaren produced, together with Bootsy Collins, a cover version of "Bird in a Gilded Cage" in hiphop style as a bonus track for a release from his album Waltz Darling, The House of the Blue Danube. (1989). Kristin Chenoweth sings the song as Lavinia Peck-Foster in season 2 episode 2 of Trial & Error.  In the 2007 film “The Assassination of Jesse James by the Coward Robert Ford” Zooey Deschanel’s character Dorthy Evans performs the song at a burlesque show in Creede, Colorado. "Bird in a Gilded Cage" is the title of Episode 17 of Season 6 of The Vampire Diaries (2015); in Season 7, Episode 13 ("This Woman's Work," 2016), the character Beau, played by Jaiden Kaine, sings snatches of the song while exiting an English tavern in 1903.

One episode of the television series Land of the Giants was titled "The Golden Cage" about an Earthling who lives in a lavish bungalow set up by the "giants".

See also 
 List of best-selling sheet music

References

External links

1900 songs
20th-century ballads
American songs
Songs with music by Harry Von Tilzer
Songs with lyrics by Arthur J. Lamb